The 1992 Dunhill Cup was the eighth Dunhill Cup. It was a team tournament featuring 16 countries, each represented by three players. The Cup was played 15–18 October at the Old Course at St Andrews in Scotland. The sponsor was the Alfred Dunhill company. The English team of David Gilford, Steven Richardson, and Jamie Spence beat the Scottish team of Gordon Brand Jnr, Sandy Lyle, and Colin Montgomerie in the final. It was the second win for England.

Format
The Cup was a match play event played over four days. The teams were divided into four four-team groups. The top eight teams were seeded with the remaining teams randomly placed in the groups. After three rounds of round-robin play, the top team in each group advanced to a single elimination playoff.

In each team match, the three players were paired with their opponents and played 18 holes at medal match play. Tied matches were extended to a sudden-death playoff only if they affected the outcome between the two teams. The tie-breaker for ties within a group was based on the total team score.

Group play

Round one
Source:

Group 1

Park was disqualified.

Group 2

Olazábal won on the 1st playoff hole.

Gilford won on the first playoff hole.

Group 3

Group 4

Round two
Source:

Group 1

Group 2

Group 3

Group 4

Thül won on the first playoff hole.

Round three
Source:

Group 1

Waite won on the second playoff hole.

Group 2

Grappasonni won on the first playoff hole.

Group 3

Group 4

Thül won on the first playoff hole.

Standings

Playoffs
Source:

Bracket

Semi-finals

Final

Team results

Player results

References

Alfred Dunhill Cup
Dunhill Cup
Dunhill Cup
Dunhill Cup